Mathletics may refer to:

Education

Mathematics
 Mathletics (educational software), mathematics teaching software, a product of Australian company 3P Learning

Arts and entertainment

Music
 "Mathletics" (Foals song)

See also
 List of mathematics competitions
 Mathlete
 All pages beginning with "Mathletics"